Emma Georgina Rothschild  (born 16 May 1948) is a British economic historian, a professor of history at Harvard University. She is director of the Joint Centre for History and Economics at Harvard, and an honorary Professor of History and Economics at the University of Cambridge. She formerly served as board member of United Nations Foundation and as a professor at the École des hautes études en sciences sociales (EHESS) in Paris.

She is a member of the Rothschild banking family of England and a trustee of the Rothschild Archive, the international centre in London for research into the history of the Rothschild family.

Early life and education
Rothschild was born in London, England, the daughter of Victor Rothschild (1910–1990) and his second wife, Teresa Georgina Rothschild (née Mayor; 1915–1996). On her father's side, she descends from the Rothschild family. Her maternal grandfather, Robert John Grote Mayor, was the brother of English novelist F. M. Mayor and a greatnephew of philosopher and clergyman John Grote. Her maternal grandmother, Katherine Beatrice Meinertzhagen, was the sister of soldier Richard Meinertzhagen and the niece of author Beatrice Webb. She is the sister of Amschel Mayor James Rothschild and the half-sister of Jacob Rothschild, 4th Baron Rothschild. At the age of 15, she became the youngest woman ever admitted to Somerville College, Oxford University, from which she graduated with a BA in Philosophy, Politics and Economics in 1967. She was a Kennedy Scholar in Economics at the Massachusetts Institute of Technology (MIT).

Professorships
From 1978 to 1988, she was an associate professor at MIT in the Department of Humanities and the Program on Science, Technology, and Society and also taught at the École des Hautes Études en Sciences Sociales in Paris, France.  She then was a Fellow at King's College, Cambridge, and continues to be an honorary Professor of History and Economics at the Cambridge History faculty.

Academic achievements, awards and honours
In recognition of her services to Britain's international cultural and academic relations, Rothschild was made a Companion of the Order of St Michael and St George in the New Year Honours 2000. She was elected to the American Philosophical Society in 2002. She is a fellow of Magdalene College, Cambridge.

She is an Honorary Fellow of Somerville College, Oxford.

Personal life
In 1991, Rothschild married the Indian economist and Nobel laureate Amartya Sen.

Publications
She has written extensively on economic history and the history of economic thought. Some of her publications are:
 Paradise Lost: The Decline of the Auto-Industrial Age (1973)
  Common Security and Civil Society in Africa (1999) (Co-Editor)
 Economic Sentiments: Adam Smith, Condorcet and the Enlightenment (2001)
 Language and Empire, circa 1800 (Historical Research, 2005)
 A Horrible Tragedy in the French Atlantic (Past and Present) (2006)
 The Inner Life of Empires: An Eighteenth-Century History (2011)
 ‘’An Infinite History. The Story of a Family in France over Three Centuries'’ (2021)

See also
 Rothschild banking family of England

References

External links
 Curriculum Vitae, Emma Rothschild, Cambridge University

1948 births
Living people
English people of Jewish descent
Economic historians
English historians
English economists
British women economists
Harvard University faculty
Alumni of Somerville College, Oxford
MIT School of Humanities, Arts, and Social Sciences alumni
Kennedy Scholarships
Fellows of Magdalene College, Cambridge
Companions of the Order of St Michael and St George
Emma Georgina
Daughters of barons
Members of the University of Cambridge faculty of history
Fellows of Somerville College, Oxford
British women historians
Members of the American Philosophical Society